The Reformation Church is a Lutheran church that was constructed in Moabit, a neighborhood of Berlin, Germany, between 1905 and 1907. The church's steeple, originally topped by a steep spire, was damaged during the Bombing of Berlin in World War II and replaced by a simple and much shorter spire. It is a listed building and a prominent landmark in western Moabit, the so-called Beusselkiez. Since 2011, it has been used by the Konvent an der Reformationskirche.

References 

Berlin Reformation
Lutheran churches in Berlin
Berlin Reformation
1907 establishments in Germany